The Rikken-Dōshi Kai was a political party active in the Empire of Japan in the early years of the 20th century. It was also known as simply the Dōshikai.

Founded by Prime Minister Katsura Tarō on February 7, 1913, the Rikken Dōshikai largely served to support his cabinet against criticism by Ozaki Yukio and his Rikken Seiyūkai party, which at the time held a majority of the seats in the Lower House of the Diet of Japan, as well as by Inukai Tsuyoshi of the Rikken Kokuminto party. Katsura was able to convince 90 Diet members (including all 31 members of the Chūō Club and half of the Rikken Kokumintō) to join his new party.

The party survived Katsura's death in 1913, and under the leadership of Katō Takaaki placed five of its members in the Cabinet of Prime Minister Ōkuma Shigenobu in 1914–1916. It became the majority party in the Diet after the 1915 General Election, with a 153 seats.

After the dissolution of the Ōkuma government, the Dōshikai merged with Chūseikai and other small political parties to form the Kenseikai in October 1916.

Election result

References

External links
National Diet Library of Japan

Politics of the Empire of Japan
Political parties established in 1913
Defunct political parties in Japan
1913 establishments in Japan
Political parties disestablished in 1916
1916 disestablishments in Japan